Judo competitions at the 2011 Pan American Games in Guadalajara will be held from October 26 to October 29 at the CODE II Gymnasium.

Medal summary

Medal table

Men's events

Women's events

Schedule
All times are Central Daylight Time (UTC−5).

Qualification

140 (10 per weight class) athletes will qualify to compete in judo. The top ten nations after a series of qualification tournaments will qualify. If Mexico fails to be in the top ten it will take the place of the tenth place country.

References

External links
 

 
2011
Events at the 2011 Pan American Games
American Games
Judo competitions in Mexico
International sports competitions hosted by Mexico